La Penne is a commune in the Alpes-Maritimes department in southeastern France.

Population

See also
Communes of the Alpes-Maritimes department

References

External links
www.lapenne.fr Official Web site

Communes of Alpes-Maritimes
Alpes-Maritimes communes articles needing translation from French Wikipedia